Željko Janjetović is a Bosnian diplomat and the Ambassador Extraordinary and Plenipotentiary of Bosnia and Herzegovina to Germany. Previous to his posting to Berlin, Janjetović was the Bosnian Ambassador to India, Russia and Hungary. In his diplomatic career except the previously mentioned residential posts, he also covered non-residential following countries: Sri Lanka, Bangladesh, Nepal, Armenia, Belarus, Kazakhstan, Kyrgyzstan, Uzbekistan. In the period between 2005–2008, Janjetovic worked in a multinational company "Global Ispat-London Mumbai" as the executive director of business development for southeastern Europe.

References

Year of birth missing (living people)
Living people
Ambassadors of Bosnia and Herzegovina to Russia
Ambassadors of Bosnia and Herzegovina to India
Ambassadors of Bosnia and Herzegovina to Armenia
Ambassadors of Bosnia and Herzegovina to Belarus
Ambassadors of Bosnia and Herzegovina to Kazakhstan
Ambassadors of Bosnia and Herzegovina to Kyrgyzstan
Ambassadors of Bosnia and Herzegovina to Uzbekistan
Ambassadors of Bosnia and Herzegovina to Ukraine
Bosnia and Herzegovina diplomats
Place of birth missing (living people)